Ā, Domo. Hajimemashite (Japanese: あっ、ども。はじめまして。, "Oh, Hi. It reached the 2nd place on the Oricon Weekly Albums Chart.

Track listing 
 道 (Michi)
 Day by Day
 愛唄 (Ai Uta)
 High G.K Low～ハジケロ～ (Hajikero)
 New Life
 子犬 (Koinu)
 Miss You
 手紙 (Tegami)
 パリピポ (Paripipo)
 レゲレゲ (Regerege)
 ミドリ (Midori)

References 

Greeeen albums
2007 debut albums